The 1997–98 NBA season was the 28th season of the National Basketball Association in Cleveland, Ohio. With the departure of their top players from last season, the Cavaliers added youth to their roster, with the addition of last season's first round draft pick Zydrunas Ilgauskas from Lithuania, who missed all of last season with a foot injury, top draft pick Derek Anderson, first round draft pick Brevin Knight, and second round draft pick Cedric Henderson from the 1997 NBA draft. In the off-season, the team acquired All-Star forward Shawn Kemp from the Seattle SuperSonics in a three-team trade, acquired Wesley Person from the Phoenix Suns in another three-team trade, and signed free agent Mitchell Butler. 

The Cavaliers struggled with a 4–6 start to the season, as Bob Sura went down with an ankle injury and only played just 46 games, and Butler was out for the remainder of the season with a neck injury after 18 games. However, the team posted a ten-game winning streak between November and December, and later on held a 27–20 record at the All-Star break. The Cavaliers played above .500 for the remainder of the season finishing 5th in the Central Division with a 47–35 record, qualifying for the playoffs after a one-year absence. The Cavaliers had the best team defensive rating in the NBA.

Kemp averaged 18.0 points, 9.3 rebounds and 1.4 steals per game, and was selected for the 1998 NBA All-Star Game, which would be his sixth and final All-Star appearance, while Person averaged 14.7 points and 1.6 steals per game, and also led the league with 192 three-point field goals. In addition, Ilgauskas averaged 13.9 points, 8.8 rebounds and 1.6 blocks per game, and won the MVP award in the Rookie Game during the All-Star Weekend in New York, while Knight provided the team with 9.0 points, 8.2 assists, and led the league with 196 total steals, averaging 2.5 per game. Anderson contributed 11.7 points and 1.3 steals per game off the bench, playing 66 games due to a knee injury, while Henderson provided with 10.1 points per game, and second-year center Vitaly Potapenko averaged 7.1 points and 3.9 rebounds per game off the bench. Both Ilgauskas and Knight were named to the NBA All-Rookie First Team, while Anderson and Henderson were both selected the NBA All-Rookie Second Team, and head coach Mike Fratello finished in third place in Coach of the Year voting.

However, in the Eastern Conference First Round of the playoffs, the Cavaliers would lose in four games to the Indiana Pacers, and they would not make it back to the postseason until 2006. For the season, the team slightly redesigned their uniforms, which remained in use until 1999.

As of 2022, this is the last time the Cavaliers made the playoffs without LeBron James.

Offseason

Free Agents

Trades

Draft picks

*1st round pick acquired from Phoenix in three-way Antonio McDyess deal.

Roster

Regular season

Season standings

z - clinched division title
y - clinched division title
x - clinched playoff spot

Record vs. opponents

Game log

|- align="center" bgcolor=
|-
|| || || || || ||
|-

|- align="center" bgcolor=
|-
|| || || || || ||
|-

|- align="center" bgcolor=
|-
|| || || || || ||
|-

|- align="center" bgcolor=
|-
|| || || || || ||
|-

|- align="center" bgcolor=
|-
|| || || || || ||
|-

|- align="center" bgcolor=
|-
|| || || || || ||
|-

|- align="center" bgcolor=
|-
|| || || || || ||
|-

Playoffs

|- align="center" bgcolor="#ffcccc"
| 1
| April 23
| @ Indiana
| L 77–106
| Shawn Kemp (25)
| Shawn Kemp (13)
| Brevin Knight (5)
| Market Square Arena16,644
| 0–1
|- align="center" bgcolor="#ffcccc"
| 2
| April 25
| @ Indiana
| L 86–92
| Shawn Kemp (27)
| Zydrunas Ilgauskas (10)
| Brevin Knight (7)
| Market Square Arena16,617
| 0–2
|- align="center" bgcolor="#ccffcc"
| 3
| April 27
| Indiana
| W 86–77
| Shawn Kemp (31)
| Kemp, Knight (7)
| three players tied (5)
| Gund Arena17,495
| 1–2
|- align="center" bgcolor="#ffcccc"
| 4
| April 30
| Indiana
| L 74–80
| Shawn Kemp (21)
| Shawn Kemp (12)
| Brevin Knight (6)
| Gund Arena18,188
| 1–3
|-

Player stats

Regular season

Playoffs

Player Statistics Citation:

Awards and records

Awards
 Zydrunas Ilgauskas, NBA All-Rookie First Team
 Brevin Knight, NBA All-Rookie First Team
 Derek Anderson, NBA All-Rookie Second Team
 Cedric Henderson, NBA All-Rookie Second Team

Records

Milestones

All-Star
Shawn Kemp - 1998 NBA All-Star Game

Transactions

Trades

Free Agents

Development League

References

 Cleveland Cavaliers on Database Basketball
 Cleveland Cavaliers on Basketball Reference

Cleveland Cavaliers seasons
Cleve
Cleve